Ronald Frankenberg (20 October 1929 – 20 November 2015) was a British anthropologist and sociologist, known for his study of conflict and decision-making in a Welsh village. He also contributed to the development of medical anthropology.

Frankenberg was a member of the Manchester School of British Social Anthropology.

Biography 
Frankenberg was born in London on 20 October 1929 to Louis and Sarah Frankenberg. He obtained a degree at Cambridge University and completed his MA and PhD at the University of Manchester. He was a student of Max Gluckman. For his PhD, he studied the complexities and conflict in a Welsh mining community called Glyn Ceiriog. This research was published as Village on the Border.

Frankenberg began teaching anthropology at Keele University in 1969. He was involved in studies concerning children in film, AIDS literature, and representations of death in the twentieth century. His works during the 1970s are considered to be among those by socially-oriented physicians that led to the emergence of critical medical anthropology in the United States and the United Kingdom. In his later years, Frankenberg was active in promoting this field in the United States.

Frankenberg was married to Dr. Pauline Frankenberg (née Hunt), author of Gender and Class Consciousness (1980). One of his daughters was sociologist Ruth Frankenberg.

Publications 

 Village on the Border (1957)
 Communities in Britain (1966)

See also
Bronislaw Malinowski Award

References

External links
 interviewed by Alan Macfarlane 5 July 1983 (video)
Ronald Frankenberg at "Pioneers of Qualitative Research" from the Economic and Social Data Service

British anthropologists
Academics of Keele University
1929 births
2015 deaths